Deh-e Now (also Romanized as Deh-e Now and Deh Now) is a village in Bala Velayat Rural District, Bala Velayat District, Bakharz County, Razavi Khorasan Province, Iran. At the 2006 census, its population was 232, in 46 families.

References 

Populated places in Bakharz County